Torrenieri is a town in Tuscany, central Italy, administratively a frazione of the comune of Montalcino, province of Siena. At the time of the 2001 census its population was 1,239.

References 

Frazioni of Montalcino